Adalberto "Junior" Ortiz Colón (born October 24, 1959), is a former Major League Baseball catcher. He played all or part of thirteen seasons in the majors from 1982 to 1994. He was a member of the 1991 World Champion Minnesota Twins.

Ortiz was a light-hitting catcher with a stutter.

Ortiz was known for having a strong sense of humor.

References

External links

1959 births
Living people
People from Humacao, Puerto Rico
Major League Baseball catchers
Major League Baseball players from Puerto Rico
Pittsburgh Pirates players
New York Mets players
Minnesota Twins players
Cleveland Indians players
Texas Rangers players
Nashville Sounds players
Portland Beavers players
Charleston Pirates players
Buffalo Bisons (minor league) players
Salem Pirates players
People with speech impediment